Nikola "Niki" Stajković (March 1, 1959 in Salzburg – February 17, 2017 in Hallein) was an Austrian diver who competed at five Olympics between 1972 and 1992 (1984 excepted). His best position was eighth at the 1980 Olympics. He became one of the youngest Olympic competitors ever when he made his Olympic debut in 1972 at age thirteen.

On February 17, 2017, Niki was found dead at the bottom of a pool, after undertaking a training session with his wife, who had left early.

He was sporting director for the Red Bull Cliff Diving Series.

References

External links
 Sports-Reference Profile

1959 births
2017 deaths
Austrian male divers
Divers at the 1972 Summer Olympics
Divers at the 1976 Summer Olympics
Divers at the 1980 Summer Olympics
Divers at the 1988 Summer Olympics
Divers at the 1992 Summer Olympics
Olympic divers of Austria
Sportspeople from Salzburg